Jean-Julien Rojer and Horia Tecău were the defending champions, but Tecău could not participate due to injury and Rojer chose to compete in Lyon instead.

Oliver Marach and Mate Pavić won the title, defeating Ivan Dodig and Rajeev Ram in the final, 3–6, 7–6(7–3), [11–9].

Seeds

Draw

Draw

References
 Main Draw

Geneva Open - Doubles
Doubles
2018 in Swiss sport